Casimiro is a Portuguese and Spanish surname.  Notable people with the surname include:

 Acácio Casimiro (born 1949), Portuguese footballer
 Augusto Casimiro (1889-1967), Portuguese journalist
 Bayani Casimiro (1918-1989), Filipino dancer
 Carlos Casimiro (born 1976), Dominican Republic baseball player
 Casemiro (born as Carlos Henrique Casimiro 1992), Brazilian footballer
 Didier Casimiro (born 1966), Russian government official
 Fernando Casimiro (born 1931), Portuguese sprinter
 Henrique Casimiro (born 1986), Portuguese cyclist
 Isabel Casimiro, Mozambican sociologist
 Joaquim Casimiro (1808-1862), Portuguese composer and organist
 Julie Casimiro (born 1962), American politician
 Luis Casimiro, Spanish basketball coach
 Manuel Casimiro (born 1941), Portuguese painter
 Zico Luzinho Ingles Casimiro (born 1985), East Timorese footballer

See also
 Casimiro (given name)

Portuguese-language surnames
Spanish-language surnames